My Decade is the third extended play by South Korea-based American singer Jessica Jung. It was released on August 9, 2017, by Coridel Entertainment and Interpark.

Meant to celebrate her 10th anniversary of debut as a singer, the EP contains 6 songs, including the previously released single "Because It's Spring" and the title track "Summer Storm", as well as the final single "Starry Night". Unlike Jung's previous EPs, My Decade does not have an English version.

Promotion

Singles 
"It's Spring" was released as a digital single on April 18, 2017, with an accompanying music video that features the singer in different sets as a type of behind the scenes.

"Summer Storm" was released as the title track in conjunction with the EP on August 9 with an accompanying music video.

"Starry Night" was released as the final single on September 1 with an accompanying lyric video that features the singer in different sets as a type of behind the scenes of the music video of the title track “Summer Storm”.

Commercial performance 
My Decade debuted and peaked at number 4 on the Gaon Album Chart, on the chart issue dated August 6–12, 2017. In its second week, the EP fell to number 9, and after a week off the chart, re-entered in its fourth week at number 10. The EP also debuted and peaked at number 5 on US World Albums, in the week ending August 26, 2017.

The EP placed at number 9 on the Gaon Album Chart for the month of August 2017, with 44,684 physical copies sold.

Track listing

Charts

Release history

References 

2017 EPs
K-pop EPs
Interpark Music EPs